The Australia men's national inline hockey team represents Australia in international inline hockey competitions. They are controlled by Ice Hockey Australia for events organised by the International Ice Hockey Federation and by Skate Australia for events organised by the International Roller Sports Federation. Australia plays in Division I of the IIHF InLine Hockey World Championship and Group C at the FIRS Inline Hockey World Championships.

Governing bodies
The Australia men's inline hockey team is controlled by two governing bodies. Ice Hockey Australia controls the Australian team in events organised by the International Ice Hockey Federation. They are the governing body for all ice hockey in Australia also responsible for fielding teams in international ice hockey tournaments. Skate Australia controls the Australian team in all other inline hockey tournaments through their umbrella association Inline Hockey Australia and are the recognised national federation for roller sports in Australia by the International Roller Sports Federation. Skate Australia is the controlling body of roller sports in Australia including artistic roller skating, inline speed skating, roller hockey, roller derby, skateboarding and aggressive inline skating.

History

In 1996 Australia first competed in the inaugural IIHF InLine Hockey World Championship held in Minneapolis and Saint Paul, Minnesota, United States. Australia finished tenth out of the 11 teams competing. In 2000 Australia finished with their best result and finished ninth overall at the World Championship. Australia continued to compete in the annual World Championships missing only the 2002 tournament.

Following the split of the World Championship in 2003 into two division, Top division and Division I, Australia was relegated into Division I. They finished with their best result in the Division I tournament finishing third behind Japan and Brazil. In 2006 Australia suffered their worst ever finish at the World Championships finishing 14th out of 16 teams.

International competitions

IIHF Inline Hockey World Championship

1996 – 10th
1997 – 11th
1998 – 14th
1999 – No tournament held
2000 – 9th
2001 – 10th
2002 – Did not participate
2003 – 11th (3rd in Division I)
2004 – 13th (5th in Division I)
2005 – 13th (5th in Division I)
2006 – 14th (6th in Division I)

2007 – 12th (4th in Division I)
2008 – 12th (4th in Division I)
2009 – 13th (5th in Division I)
2010 – 12th (4th in Division I)
2011 – 12th (4th in Division I)
2012 – 13th (5th in Division I)
2013 – 12th (4th in Division I)
2014 – 10th (2nd in Division I)
2015 – 10th (2nd in Division I)
2017 – 11th (3rd in Division I)

Roster
From the 2017 IIHF Inline Hockey World Championship Division I

References

External links
Ice Hockey Australia

National inline hockey teams
Inline hockey
Inline hockey in Australia